Mohamed Arkab (born 19 February 1966) is an Algerian politician who is serving as Minister of Energy since 22 February 2021.

Biography
Arkab was born in 1966 in the municipality of Hussein Dey in Algiers.

After studying in Algeria, he obtained a diploma in mechanical engineering at the University of Science and Technology Houari Boumediene. He also began studies to obtain a master's degree in business administration MBA in a cycle of business management.

He then joined Sonelgaz in 1990 where he spent his entire professional career, and where he was notably responsible for the Compagnie de l'Engineering de l'Electricité et du Gaz CEEG-Spa.

Arkab was appointed as chairman of the company Sonelgaz from 30 August 2017 until he took office as Minister of Energy on 1 April 2019.

He announced in May 2019 that he was opposed to the takeover of the assets of the American company Anadarko Petroleum in Algeria by the French company Total SE.

Arkab took up his new functions at the head of the Ministry of Energy and Mining on 22 February 2021.

Functions
The summary of Arkab's professional career includes the following:
 from 21 February 2021: Minister of Energy and Mines.
 2020 – 2021: Minister of Mines.
 2019 – 2020: Minister of Energy.
 2017 – 2019: Chief executive officer (CEO) of Sonelgaz.
 2010 – 2017: CEO of CEEG, subsidiary of Sonelgaz.
 2006 – 2010: CEO of Etterkib, a subsidiary of Sonelgaz.

See also
 University of Science and Technology Houari Boumediene
 Sonelgaz
 Ministry of Energy and Mining

References

1966 births
Living people
Algerian people
People from Algiers
Mechanical engineers
University of Science and Technology Houari Boumediene alumni
Algerian chief executives
Algerian Ministers of Energy and Mines
Government ministers of Algeria
21st-century Algerian people